Finland is an unincorporated community in Bamberg County, in the U.S. state of South Carolina.

History
Finland was so named in order to fit with the railroad's "Scandinavian" naming scheme; other such examples include Norway, South Carolina and Sweden, South Carolina.

References

Unincorporated communities in Bamberg County, South Carolina
Unincorporated communities in South Carolina